Prosta Tower is an office building located in Wola, Warsaw.

History 

Building permits were obtained in 2006, and construction began in 2007 and ended in September 2011. Prosta Tower has 19 floors above ground and has a 5 floor car park underground. It adjoins the northern side of Łucka City, which is a pairing system unique to Poland and is rarely seen elsewhere. The building was designed by Stefan Kuryłowicz. Initially, the project was a residential building, but the investor, Marvipol, made it become an office building because of the financial crisis at the time. Because of this decision, the building gained its characteristic openwork facade, which also limits sun exposure inside the building by around 40%.

References 

Wola
Skyscrapers in Warsaw
Office buildings completed in 2011